Subramanian Anand (born 14 January 1986) is an Indian cricketer. He is a right-handed batsman and leg-break bowler who played for Badureliya Sports Club in Sri Lanka. Anand made his cricketing debut for Badureliya Sports Club in a List A match against Saracens Sports Club, picking up four wickets on debut. Anand's first-class debut came during October 2009, against Nondescripts Cricket Club, in an innings defeat which saw him score 24 runs in the first innings and a duck in the second.

He started playing for Puducherry cricket team in India from the 2019-20 Domestic cricket season. He made his Twenty20 debut on 9 November 2019, for Meghalaya in the 2019–20 Syed Mushtaq Ali Trophy.

He was born in Chennai.

References

External links
Subramanian Anand at Cricket Archive

1986 births
Living people
Indian cricketers
Badureliya Sports Club cricketers
Pondicherry cricketers